|}

The Red Mills Trial Hurdle is a Grade 3 National Hunt hurdle race in Ireland. It is run at Gowran Park in February, over a distance of about 2 miles and during the race there are nine hurdles to be jumped. It was downgraded from Grade 2 to Grade 3 in 2017.

Records
Most successful horse since 1990 (2 wins):
 	Theatreworld – 1997,1998

Leading jockey since 1990 (4 wins):
 Conor O'Dwyer – Balla Sola (2000), Youlneverwalkalone (2001), Fadoudal Du Cochet (2002), Hardy Eustace (2005) 

Leading trainer since 1990 (6 wins):
 Willie Mullins -  Balla Sola (2000), Zaidpour (2012), So Young (2013), Un de Sceaux (2014), Sempre Medici (2016), Cilaos Emery (2020)

Winners since 1990

See also
 Horse racing in Ireland
 List of Irish National Hunt races

References

Racing Post:
, 

National Hunt races in Ireland
National Hunt hurdle races
Gowran Park Racecourse